Spin Zone (or Lip Service) is an EP by Deathline International, released on February 9, 2018, by COP International.

Track listing

Personnel
Adapted from the Spin Zone liner notes.

Deathline International
 Steve Lam (as SLam) – programming, guitar, backing vocals, mixing, bass guitar (1)
 James Perry – guitar, backing vocals, programming (2, 5)
 Christian Petke (as Count 0) – vocals , programming, engineering, mixing

Additional performers
 Angela Goodman – backing vocals (1) 
 Caitlin Gutekunst – vocals (3, 4, 6)

Release history

References

External links 
 Lip Service at Discogs (list of releases)
  Spin Zone at Bandcamp

2018 EPs
Deathline International albums
COP International EPs